{{DISPLAYTITLE:C19H24N2O4}}
The molecular formula C19H24N2O4 (molar mass: 344.40 g/mol, exact mass: 344.1736 u) may refer to:

 Arformoterol
 Formoterol
 Tolamolol